Cheshmeh Kabud (also Romanized as Cheshmeh Kabūd) is a village in Sar Firuzabad Rural District, Firuzabad District, Kermanshah County, Kermanshah Province, Iran. At the 2006 census, its population was 23, in 6 families.

References 

Populated places in Kermanshah County